Demidov is a Russian noble family.

Demidov may also refer to:
Demidov (surname) or Demidova, a surname
Demidov, Smolensk Oblast, a town and the administrative center of Demidovsky District of Smolensk Oblast, Russia
Demidov (inhabited locality), a list of inhabited localities named Demidov
Demidov Bridge, a bridge in St. Petersburg, Russia
Demidov Island, an island in Antarctica

See also
Demidov Prize, a national scientific prize in the Russian Empire